Jumpers for Goalposts: Live at Wembley Stadium is a home video by English singer-songwriter Ed Sheeran, released on Blu-ray on 13 November 2015. It features the footage taken from Sheeran's x Tour, when he became the first solo artist to take the stage (without a band) at Wembley Stadium in London and played across three sold out nights to a crowd of 240,000 people. Jumpers for Goalposts: Live at Wembley Stadium features performances of hits like "The A Team", "Sing" or "Thinking Out Loud". Sir Elton John duets with Sheeran on two songs. 

The title “Jumpers for Goalposts” alludes to street/park football in the UK, a practice where jumpers would be placed on the ground and used as goalposts, a nod from Sheeran playing the concerts at Wembley Stadium, the home of English football. Aside from the live performances, Jumpers for Goalposts: Live at Wembley Stadium gives viewers an insight into life backstage on the road with Sheeran. Simultaneously, Jumpers for Goalposts: Live at Wembley Stadium was released on DVD as part of the re-release of Sheeran's 2014 x album. This CD/DVD combo titled x (Wembley Edition) also includes five new tracks on the CD portion.

Track listing

Charts

Weekly charts

Year-end charts

Release history

References

External links

 

2015 video albums
Live video albums
Ed Sheeran albums